Thirayu Banhan (born 19 February 1994) is a Thai professional footballer who plays as an attacking midfielder for Thai League 1 club PT Prachuap.

Honours
 Chiangrai United
 Thai FA Cup (1): 2020–21
 Thailand Champions Cup (1): 2020

External links
 

1994 births
Living people
Thirayu Banhan
Thirayu Banhan
Association football midfielders
Thirayu Banhan
Thirayu Banhan
Thirayu Banhan
Thirayu Banhan
Thirayu Banhan